Gabriela Weronika Janik (born 10 March 1993) is a Polish artistic gymnast. She competed at the 2020 Olympic Games and the 2019 World Championships.

Personal life 
Gabriela Janik was born on 10 March 1993, in Kraków. She studied at the University of Technology and Life Sciences in Bydgoszcz.

Career 
Janik competed at the 2008 Junior European Championships and finished 7th in the vault final. She won the silver medal on vault behind Paula Plichta at the 2010 FIG World Cup in Osijek. She competed at the 2010 World Championships alongside Plichta, Marta Pihan-Kulesza, Katarzyna Jurkowska, Monika Frandofert, and Joanna Litewka, and they finished 17th in the team qualification round. 

At the 2011 FIG World Cup in Osijek, Janik won the bronze medal on vault behind Valeria Maksyuta and Brittany Rogers. She competed at the 2011 European Championships and finished 29th in the qualification round, which made her the first reserve for the all-around final. She competed at the 2011 World Championships where she finished 72nd in the qualification round. Because Marta Pihan-Kulesza placed higher than her and Poland was only allowed one spot, Janik did not qualify for the 2012 Olympic Games.

She competed at the 2012 FIG World Cup in Ostrava and finished 7th in the vault final and 5th in the uneven bars final. She competed at the 2014 European Championships with Marta Pihan-Kulesza, Katarzyna Jurkowska-Kowalska, Claudia Chmielowska, and Alma Kuc, and the team finished 10th. She competed at the 2014 World Championships alongside Chmielowska, Pihan-Kulesza, Jurkowska-Kowalska, Kuc, and Paula Plichta, and the team finished 17th. In November of 2014, she had shoulder surgery and stopped training for six months to recover.

Janik competed at the 2015 European Games with Katarzyna Jurkowska-Kowalska and Paula Plichta. The team finished in 11th in the team competition. Individually, Janik finished 12th in the all-around final with a total score of 51.532. She finished 4th in the vault final with a score of 13.966. She then competed at the 2015 World Championships with Claudia Chmielowska, Katarzyna Jurkowska-Kowalska, Klara Kopeć, Alma Kuc, and Marta Pihan-Kulesza, and the team finished 19th.

At the 2016 FIG World Challenge Cup in Cottbus, she won the bronze medal on the uneven bars behind Sophie Scheder and Zhu Xiaofang. She then competed at Olympic Test Event and finished 35th in the all-around. Because Poland was only allowed to qualify one spot and Katarzyna Jurkowska-Kowalska placed higher than her, Janik did not qualify for the 2016 Olympic Games. She competed at the 2016 European Championships alongside Jurkowska-Kowalska, Klara Kopeć, Alma Kuc, and Paula Plichta, and they finished 11th.

Janik competed at the 2017 European Championships, and she was the second reserve for the vault event final. At the FIG World Cup in Osijek, she won the bronze medal on the uneven bars behind Anastasiia Iliankova and Zsófia Kovács. She then competed at the 2017 Summer Universiade, and she finished 7th in the all-around final with a total score of 52.050, and she finished 5th in the vault final. At the FIG World Cup in Cottbus, she finished 7th in the vault final.

At the 2018 FIG World Cup in Guimarães, she won the silver medal on vault behind Yeo Seo-jeong. She then competed at the 2018 European Championships with Katarzyna Jurkowska-Kowalska, Wiktoria Łopuszanska, and Marta Pihan-Kulesza, and the team finished 13th. The same team competed at the 2018 World Championships, and the finished 22nd.

Janik competed at the 2019 European Championships, and she was the second reserve for the all-around final. She then competed at the 2019 European Games, and she finished 13th in the all-around final with a total of 50.033. Additionally, she finished 4th in the vault final. At the 2019 World Championships, Janik finished 79th in the all-around, and she qualified an individual spot for the 2020 Olympic Games.

References

External links 
 

1993 births
Living people
Polish female artistic gymnasts
Sportspeople from Kraków
Gymnasts at the 2015 European Games
Gymnasts at the 2019 European Games
European Games competitors for Poland
Gymnasts at the 2020 Summer Olympics
Olympic gymnasts of Poland